Androsace mathildae is an alpine cushion plant in the family Primulaceae, endemic to the Abruzzo Apennines in Italy.

References

mathildae
Alpine flora
Flora of Italy